The Grove Street Elementary School is a historic school in Woonsocket, Rhode Island.  The two-story brick Stick/Eastlake style school was designed by Edward L. Angell of Providence and built in 1876.  In c. 1885 it was enlarged by adding a matching addition to its rear, joined by a small hyphen.  This addition is more Queen Anne in its styling.

The building, a well-preserved example of modern schools of the 1870s, was listed on the National Register of Historic Places in 1982.

See also
National Register of Historic Places listings in Providence County, Rhode Island

References

School buildings on the National Register of Historic Places in Rhode Island
Schools in Providence County, Rhode Island
Buildings and structures in Woonsocket, Rhode Island
National Register of Historic Places in Providence County, Rhode Island